Villnachern is a municipality in the district of Brugg in the canton of Aargau in Switzerland.

Geography

Of this area,  or 29.1% is used for agricultural purposes, while  or 49.7% is forested.

Of the built up area, housing and buildings made up 7.8% and transportation infrastructure made up 4.2%.  46.9% of the total land area is heavily forested and 2.8% is covered with orchards or small clusters of trees.  Of the agricultural land, 17.1% is used for growing crops and 9.2% is pastures, while 2.8% is used for orchards or vine crops.  All the water in the municipality is in rivers and streams.

Coat of arms
The blazon of the municipal coat of arms is Azure a Ploughshare Or between in Chief two Mullets of Five of the same.

Demographics
Over the last 10 years (1997–2007) the population has changed at a rate of 18.1%. Most of the population speaks German (92.0%), with French being second most common ( 1.1%) and Italian being third ( 1.1%).

The age distribution, in Villnachern is; 184 children or 12.4% of the population are between 0 and 9 years old and 166 teenagers or 11.2% are between 10 and 19.  Of the adult population, 151 people or 10.2% of the population are between 20 and 29 years old.  195 people or 13.1% are between 30 and 39, 234 people or 15.7% are between 40 and 49, and 218 people or 14.7% are between 50 and 59.  The senior population distribution is 195 people or 13.1% of the population are between 60 and 69 years old, 91 people or 6.1% are between 70 and 79, there are 44 people or 3.0% who are between 80 and 89,and there are 8 people or 0.5% who are 90 and older.

, there were 45 homes with 1 or 2 persons in the household, 212 homes with 3 or 4 persons in the household, and 227 homes with 5 or more persons in the household.  The average number of people per household was 2.40 individuals.  , there were 497 private households (homes and apartments) in the municipality, and an average of 2.4 persons per household.   there were 333 single family homes (or 50.4% of the total) out of a total of 661 homes and apartments.  Over the 8 years between the two surveys, the number of private households in the municipality increased by 164.  There were a total of 10 empty apartments for a 1.5% vacancy rate.  , the construction rate of new housing units was 5.5 new units per 1000 residents.

In the 2007 federal election the most popular party was the SVP which received 37.8% of the vote.  The next three most popular parties were the SP (18.5%), the FDP (11.6%) and the CVP (10.2%).

In Villnachern about 82.2% of the population (between age 25-64) have completed either non-mandatory upper secondary education or additional higher education (either university or a Fachhochschule).  Of the school age population, there are 121 students attending primary school in the municipality.

The historical population is given in the following table:

Heritage sites of national significance
The Tithe barn at Vorstadt 2 is listed as a Swiss heritage site of national significance.

Economy
, Villnachern had an unemployment rate of 1.83%.  , there were 54 people employed in the primary economic sector and about 13 businesses involved in this sector.  72 people are employed in the secondary sector and there are 16 businesses in this sector.  80 people are employed in the tertiary sector, with 30 businesses in this sector.

 there was a total of 635 workers who lived in the municipality.  Of these, 530 or about 83.5% of the residents worked outside Villnachern while 72 people commuted into the municipality for work.  There were a total of 177 jobs (of at least 6 hours per week) in the municipality.  Of the working population, 15.9% used public transportation to get to work, and 56.7% used a private car.

Religion
Of the rest of the population, there were 4 individuals (or about 0.33% of the population) who belonged to the Christian Catholic faith.

References

Municipalities of Aargau
Cultural property of national significance in Aargau